In classical electromagnetism, magnetic vector potential (often called A) is the vector quantity defined so that its curl is equal to the magnetic field: . Together with the electric potential φ, the magnetic vector potential can be used to specify the electric field E as well.  Therefore, many equations of electromagnetism can be written either in terms of the fields E and B, or equivalently in terms of the potentials φ and A. In more advanced theories such as quantum mechanics, most equations use potentials rather than fields.

Magnetic vector potential was first introduced by Franz Ernst Neumann and Wilhelm Eduard Weber in 1845 and in 1846, respectively. Lord Kelvin also introduced vector potential in 1847, along with the formula relating it to the magnetic field.

Magnetic vector potential 
The magnetic vector potential A is a vector field, defined along with the electric potential ϕ (a scalar field) by the equations:

where B is the magnetic field and E is the electric field. In magnetostatics where there is no time-varying charge distribution, only the first equation is needed. (In the context of electrodynamics, the terms vector potential and scalar potential are used for magnetic vector potential and electric potential, respectively. In mathematics, vector potential and scalar potential can be generalized to higher dimensions.)

If electric and magnetic fields are defined as above from potentials, they automatically satisfy two of Maxwell's equations: Gauss's law for magnetism and Faraday's law. For example, if A is continuous and well-defined everywhere, then it is guaranteed not to result in magnetic monopoles. (In the mathematical theory of magnetic monopoles, A is allowed to be either undefined or multiple-valued in some places; see magnetic monopole for details).

Starting with the above definitions and remembering that the divergence of the curl is zero and the curl of the gradient is the zero vector:

Alternatively, the existence of A and ϕ is guaranteed from these two laws using Helmholtz's theorem. For example, since the magnetic field is divergence-free (Gauss's law for magnetism; i.e.), A always exists that satisfies the above definition.

The vector potential A is used when studying the Lagrangian in classical mechanics and in quantum mechanics (see Schrödinger equation for charged particles, Dirac equation, Aharonov–Bohm effect).

In the SI system, the units of A are V·s·m−1 and are the same as that of momentum per unit charge, or force per unit current. In minimal coupling, qA is called the potential momentum, and is part of the canonical momentum.

The line integral of A over a closed loop, Γ, is equal to the magnetic flux, Φ, through a surface, S, that it encloses:

Therefore, the units of A are also equivalent to Weber per metre. The above equation is useful in the flux quantization of superconducting loops.

Although the magnetic field B is a pseudovector (also called axial vector), the vector potential A is a polar vector.  This means that if the right-hand rule for cross products were replaced with a left-hand rule, but without changing any other equations or definitions, then B would switch signs, but A would not change. This is an example of a general theorem: The curl of a polar vector is a pseudovector, and vice versa.

Gauge choices 

The above definition does not define the magnetic vector potential uniquely because, by definition, we can arbitrarily add curl-free components to the magnetic potential without changing the observed magnetic field. Thus, there is a degree of freedom available when choosing A. This condition is known as gauge invariance.

Maxwell's equations in terms of vector potential 

Using the above definition of the potentials and applying it to the other two Maxwell's equations (the ones that are not automatically satisfied) results in a complicated differential equation that can be simplified using the Lorenz gauge where A is chosen to satisfy:

Using the Lorenz gauge, Maxwell's equations can be written compactly in terms of the magnetic vector potential A and the electric scalar potential ϕ:

In other gauges, the equations are different. A different notation to write these same equations (using four-vectors) is shown below.

Calculation of potentials from source distributions 

The solutions of Maxwell's equations in the Lorenz gauge (see Feynman and Jackson) with the boundary condition that both potentials go to zero sufficiently fast as they approach infinity are called the retarded potentials, which are the magnetic vector potential  and the electric scalar potential  due to a current distribution of current density , charge density , and volume Ω, within which ρ and J are non-zero at least sometimes and some places):

where the fields at position vector r and time t are calculated from sources at distant position r′ at an earlier time t′. The location r′ is a source point in the charge or current distribution (also the integration variable, within volume Ω). The earlier time t′ is called the retarded time, and calculated as

There are a few notable things about A and ϕ calculated in this way:

 The Lorenz gauge condition:  is satisfied.
 The position of r, the point at which values for ϕ and A are found, only enters the equation as part of the scalar distance from r′ to r. The direction from r′ to r does not enter into the equation. The only thing that matters about a source point is how far away it is.
 The integrand uses retarded time, t′. This simply reflects the fact that changes in the sources propagate at the speed of light. Hence the charge and current densities affecting the electric and magnetic potential at r and t, from remote location r′ must also be at some prior time t′.
 The equation for A is a vector equation. In Cartesian coordinates, the equation separates into three scalar equations:  In this form it is easy to see that the component of A in a given direction depends only on the components of J that are in the same direction. If the current is carried in a long straight wire, A points in the same direction as the wire.

In other gauges, the formula for A and ϕ is different; for example, see Coulomb gauge for another possibility.

Depiction of the A-field 

See Feynman for the depiction of the A field around a long thin solenoid.

Since 

assuming quasi-static conditions, i.e. 

the lines and contours of A relate to B like the lines and contours of B relate to J.  Thus, a depiction of the A field around a loop of B flux (as would be produced in a toroidal inductor) is qualitatively the same as the B field around a loop of current.

The figure to the right is an artist's depiction of the A field.  The thicker lines indicate paths of higher average intensity (shorter paths have higher intensity so that the path integral is the same).  The lines are drawn to (aesthetically) impart the general look of the A-field.

The drawing tacitly assumes , true under one of the following assumptions:
 the Coulomb gauge is assumed
 the Lorenz gauge is assumed and there is no distribution of charge, 
 the Lorenz gauge is assumed and zero frequency is assumed
 the Lorenz gauge is assumed and a non-zero but sufficiently low frequency to neglect  is assumed

Electromagnetic four-potential 

In the context of special relativity, it is natural to join the magnetic vector potential together with the (scalar) electric potential into the electromagnetic potential, also called four-potential.

One motivation for doing so is that the four-potential is a mathematical four-vector. Thus, using standard four-vector transformation rules, if the electric and magnetic potentials are known in one inertial reference frame, they can be simply calculated in any other inertial reference frame.

Another, related motivation is that the content of classical electromagnetism can be written in a concise and convenient form using the electromagnetic four potential, especially when the Lorenz gauge is used. In particular, in abstract index notation, the set of Maxwell's equations (in the Lorenz gauge) may be written (in Gaussian units) as follows:

where □ is the d'Alembertian and J is the four-current. The first equation is the Lorenz gauge condition while the second contains Maxwell's equations.  The four-potential also plays a very important role in quantum electrodynamics.

See also 
 Magnetic scalar potential
 Aharonov–Bohm effect
 Gluon field

Notes

References

External links

Potentials
Magnetism
Vector physical quantities